William Boteler was an English 17th-century politician.

William Boteler may also refer to:

William Boteler (died 1602), MP for Lyme Regis and Bedford
William Boteler (15th century MP) for Lancashire (UK Parliament constituency)
William Boteler, 1st Baron Boteler of Werington (d. c. 1328), Baron Boteler
William Boteler, 1st Baron Boteler of Wem (d. 1334), Baron Boteler
William Boteler, 2nd Baron Boteler of Wem (d. 1361), Baron Boteler
William Boteler, 3rd Baron Boteler of Wem (d. 1369), Baron Boteler
William Boteler, 2nd Baron Boteler (d. 1657), Baron Boteler

See also
William Butler (disambiguation), spellings often used interchangeably